Bithynia bavelensis is an extinct species of freshwater snail with gills and an operculum, an aquatic prosobranch gastropod mollusk in the family Bithyniidae.

The specific name bavelensis refers to its type locality, the village Bavel, Netherlands.

Distribution 
The distribution of this species includes an Early Pleistocene of the Netherlands.

Description

References

External links

Bithyniidae
Pleistocene gastropods
Gastropods described in 1990